Nuage (French for "cloud") may refer to:

Music
 "Nuages", a 1940 jazz piece by Django Reinhardt
 Nuages (Live at Yoshi's, vol. 2), a 1997 album by Joe Pass
 Nuage, a 2007 album by Sylvain Chauveau
 "Nuages", the first movement of Nocturnes by Claude Debussy
 "Nuages", a song on the 1984 album Three of a Perfect Pair by King Crimson
 "Nuages", a song by Grégoire from the 2008 album Toi + Moi

Other uses
 Nuage (cell biology), a specific term for fruit-fly germline granules
 Nuage (horse), the leading sire in Germany for 1917
 , a 2007 French film with Aurore Clément

See also
 Nuages du Monde, a 2006 album by Canadian group Delirium
 ''Nuages gris", an 1881 piano solo by Franz Liszt